VUF can refer to:

 Verifiable unpredictable function, a public-key one-way function in cryptography; see Verifiable random function
 , the name of the Young Left (Sweden) from 1967 to 1970

See also 

 Several histamine antagonists:
 VUF-5681
 VUF-6002
 VUF-8430